The AlphaTauri AT03 is a Formula One car constructed by Scuderia AlphaTauri and racing in the 2022 Formula One World Championship. The car was driven by Pierre Gasly and Yuki Tsunoda. The AT03 is the third chassis built and designed by AlphaTauri and their first car under the 2022 technical regulations.

Complete Formula One results
(key)

References

2022 Formula One season cars
AT03